Rewari Khera is a village in Jhajjar district, Haryana, India.

It is located in the Bahadurgarh mandal of the Jhajjar district of the Haryana state, India. As of the 1990 census, it has a population of 5,000. Rewari Khera is connected by a 1 km stretch of road joining Bahadurgarh to Beri via the nearest large village, Chhara. The village has a government primary school as well as Government Senior Secondary School. The earliest eminent educated families of Rewari Khera are the Dalals.

This village has also given some known personalities such as .Mr Manphool Mudgal headmaster of primary school, Mr Tuhi Ram Sharma the most respected person of the village.

Rewari Khera has a temple of Dada Sanhuwala Maharaj, where it is said that everyone's wishes come true. Every year on the first Tuesday after Janmashtami, a cultural programme and bhandara and mela are organised by people of the village.

References

Villages in Jhajjar district